Šafov is a municipality and village in Znojmo District in the South Moravian Region of the Czech Republic. It has about 100 inhabitants.

Notable people
Ludwig Winder (1889–1946), Austrian-Czech writer, journalist and literary critic

References

Villages in Znojmo District